Airports in New York may refer to:
 Aviation in the New York metropolitan area
 List of airports in New York (state)